St. Andreas Castle is a privately owned castle located in Cham, in the Canton of Zug, Switzerland.  It is a Swiss heritage site of national significance.

The castle hill has been used since at least 400 AD, based on Roman artifacts found there. The site of the neighboring chapel has been used for religious ceremonies since the Roman era. During the 8th century the chapel site was used by a "holy bishop without a name" for Christian services.

Today the castle and chapel are located on a  private park.  While the castle is privately owned, the grounds are opened to the public twice a year.

See also
 List of castles in Switzerland

References

External links
 City of Cham website

Castles in the canton of Zug
Cham, Switzerland
Cultural property of national significance in the canton of Zug
Gothic architecture in Switzerland
Romanesque architecture in Switzerland